True4U is a Thai digital terrestrial television channel owned by True4U Station Company Limited, a unit of TrueVisions, a subsidiary of True Corporation, part of the Charoen Pokphand Group and Telenor. It broadcasts news, entertainment and sport programs. True4U is broadcasting on Thailand digital television platform on channel 24.

History 

True4U originally launched in 1998 as Shopping@Home, a shopping television channel owned by UBC and broadcast on its own platform. In 2005, the Office of Small and Medium Enterprises Promotion, a department of Ministry of Industry hired UBC to produce their own channel and rename the channel to SMEs Shop Channel. In 2009, TV Direct Co., Ltd., a Thai shopping television network, rented the channel and renamed to Shopping Network.

In 2012, the platform operator, TrueVisions relaunched the channel renaming it as "True 10" broadcasting on various platforms. True 10 aired entertainment, news and sport programs from TrueVisions and self-produced.

In December 2013, True DTT Company Limited won a digital terrestrial television license to broadcast in standard definition.

On 31 March 2014, True 10 was closed to prepare the channel to broadcast as a digital television.

True4U tested broadcast on digital television platform in April 2014 and officially launched on 22 April 2014.

On 1 January 2017, The high-definition simulcast of True4U on TrueVisions has been terminated.

References

External links

Charoen Pokphand
True Corporation
Television stations in Thailand
Television channels and stations established in 2012
Television channels and stations established in 2014